Avarneh (also Romanized as Awarneh; also known as Abarnaū, Oorneh, Owraneh, Owrūneh, Ūraneh, and Ūrneh) is a village in Dodangeh-ye Olya Rural District, Ziaabad District, Takestan County, Qazvin Province, Iran. At the 2006 census, its population was 764, in 179 families.

References 

Populated places in Takestan County